Anthony Butts (born July 28, 1969 in Detroit, Michigan) is an American poet.

Life
He graduated from Wayne State University with a bachelor's degree, from Western Michigan University, with an MFA, and University of Missouri with a PhD.

He taught at the University of Dayton as well as Carnegie Mellon University.
He was married to journalist Leah Samuel (b. 1970) from 2004-2009.

Award
 2004 William Carlos Williams Award

Works
 "The Nut Gatherers", Poetry Society of American
 
 
 The Next Generation (CMU Press, 2000)
 
 
 "Prayer" in Lines + Stars literary journal http://www.linesandstars.com/spring-2014/anthony-butts/prayer/

Anthologies

References

External links
"Healing Words: An Interview with Poet Anthony Butts", Absolute write

1969 births
Living people
American male poets
Wayne State University alumni
Western Michigan University alumni
University of Missouri alumni
University of Dayton faculty
Carnegie Mellon University faculty